Kemal Solunur (born 26 January 1951) is a Turkish boxer. He competed at the 1972 Summer Olympics and the 1976 Summer Olympics.

References

1951 births
Living people
Turkish male boxers
Olympic boxers of Turkey
Boxers at the 1972 Summer Olympics
Boxers at the 1976 Summer Olympics
Place of birth missing (living people)
Bantamweight boxers
20th-century Turkish people